Ping Koy Lam  is an Australian scientist and Professor of Physics at the Australian National University in Canberra. He is currently an Australian Research Council Australian Laureate Fellow and a work package director and program manager in the ARC Centre for Quantum Computer and Communication Technology. For his PhD thesis in 1999 he was awarded the Australian Institute of Physics Bragg Medal. He was awarded the 2003 British Council Eureka Prize for inspiring science (quantum teleportation) and the 2006 UNSW Eureka Prize for innovative research (quantum cryptography).

He researches quantum optics, optical metrology, nonlinear optics and quantum information. His highly cited research includes pioneering work in quantum memory, and optical quantum information processing.

In May 2020 he was elected fellow of the Australian Academy of Science.

References

Living people
Australian physicists
Academic staff of the Australian National University
Australian National University alumni
Year of birth missing (living people)
Fellows of the Australian Academy of Science